Valdis Mintals (born 11 December 1979 in Tallinn) is an Estonian pair skater. 

With partner Ekaterina Nekrassova, he is a multiple Estonian national champion. They competed at the World, European, and World Junior Championships before ending their partnership in 1998.

From 1998 through 2002, Mintals competed with Viktoria Shklover. They were the 1998–2002 Estonian national champions. They competed twice at the World Junior Championships, and three times at the World and European Championships. Their highest placement at an ISU Championship was 10th at the 2000 and 2001 European Championships.

Early in his career, Mintals competed in single skating.

Following his retirement in 2002 from competitive skating, Mintals performed in touring ice shows and ice theater.

Programs
(with Shklover)

Results

With Shklover

With Nekrassova

References

External links
 

Estonian male pair skaters
Estonian male single skaters
1979 births
Living people
Figure skaters from Tallinn